Comet Taylor, is a periodic comet in the Solar System, first discovered by Clement J. Taylor (Cape Town, South Africa) on November 24, 1915.

George van Biesbroeck and E. E. Barnard (Yerkes Observatory, Wisconsin, United States) observed that the comet was split into two distinct nuclei, but this was not seen after March 16.

The comet was predicted to return in 1922, but was lost (see lost comet).

In 1928 the discovery of Comet Reinmuth 1 was originally assumed to be Comet Taylor, and again in 1951 the same assumption was made with Comet Arend-Rigaux.

The 1976 return was predicted by N. A. Belyaev and V. V. Emel'yanenko and on January 25, 1977, Charles Kowal (Palomar Observatory, California, United States) found images on photographic plates for December 13, 1976.

The comet was recovered for the returns in 1984 and 1990, and in January 1998 was observed as magnitude 12 when it was 1AU from Earth.

There were 6 recovery images of 69P in October 2018 when the comet had a magnitude of about 20.5. Due to the lack of observations, when the comet is at perihelion on March 18, 2019 and 2.45AU from Earth, the 3-sigma uncertainty in the comet's Earth distance will be ±6000 km.

References

External links 
 Orbital simulation from JPL (Java) / Horizons Ephemeris
 69P/Taylor – Seiichi Yoshida @ aerith.net
 69P at Kronk's Cometography
 69P at Kazuo Kinoshita's Comets
 69P at Seiichi Yoshida's Comet Catalog

Periodic comets
0069
Comets in 2011
19151124